The Flagmen of Lowestoft are a collection of thirteen paintings by Sir Peter Lely, painted in the mid-1660s. They were originally part of the Royal Collections, though most were given to Greenwich Hospital in the nineteenth century, and are now in the National Maritime Museum in London. The paintings are of prominent naval officers, most of them of flag rank, who had fought at the Battle of Lowestoft in 1665. Lely at the time was Principal Painter to King Charles II.

Creation
The paintings were commissioned from Lely by James, Duke of York, brother of King Charles II, in late 1665. James had commanded the English fleet against the Dutch at the Battle of Lowestoft on 13 June 1665, and the portraits were intended to commemorate those who had served under him as junior flag officers and captains of some of the ships. Lely, Principal Painter to King Charles II, was working on the series known as the 'Windsor Beauties' at the time for James's wife, Anne Hyde, Duchess of York. The full set consists of thirteen portraits of admirals and senior officers, or 'Flaggmen' as they were known at the time.

Diarist and naval administrator Samuel Pepys visited Lely's studio on 18 April 1666, writing I to Mr. Lilly's , the painter; and there saw the heads, some finished and all begun, of the Flaggmen in the late great fight with the Duke of Yorke against the Dutch. The Duke of Yorke hath them done to hang in his chamber, and very finely they are done indeed. He noted that work had begun on all but three portraits, those of the Earl of Sandwich, Sir Jeremiah Smith and Sir William Penn, had yet to be started. The absence of Lawson's portrait in Pepys's list may indicate that this was a later addition to the original commission, Lawson having died on 25 June 1665 of a wound he received in the battle. Since Lawson was already dead and the portrait had not been begun by 1666, it was possibly a posthumous addition to the set.

Appraisal
Art historian Ellis Waterhouse assessed the series and declared that 'In such works Lely's splendid prose borders upon the poetry of the great masters'. Brandon Henderson wrote Strength, depth of character, and psychological interest characterize these portraits, in which Lely brings forth honest and direct likenesses, dramatic gestures, serious-mindedness, dignity and pride. Each portrait in the series is remarkably individual, with fresh and varied poses, costume, attributes and experiences. Lely's series acted as a 'precedent and a paradigm' for Sir Godfrey Kneller's 'Kit-Cat' portraits, 42 portraits of members of the Kit-Cat Club, painted between 1697 and 1721, albeit half-length and on a different size of canvas, later known as the Kit-cat.

Donation
Thirteen individual portraits were created for the Royal Collections. In 1824 King George IV donated 31 paintings with naval connections to Greenwich Hospital, in support of the hospital's director, Edward Hawke Locker, who aimed to establish a naval gallery. Eleven of the flagmen portraits were included in the donation. The exceptions were the portraits of Admiral Sir John Lawson and Prince Rupert, which were retained in the Royal Collections. A copy of Lawson's portrait was instead presented in lieu of the original. George's successor, King William IV, presented an extended full-length copy of the Prince Rupert portrait to the Hospital in 1835. The portraits are now held by the successor of Greenwich Hospital, the National Maritime Museum.

Portraits

Notes

a.  The dimensions and details are for Lely's original portrait, still held in the Royal Collections. The image is however the full-length copy presented to Greenwich Hospital.

Citations

References

Sets of portraits
Paintings by Peter Lely
1660s paintings
Paintings in the collection of Royal Museums Greenwich
James II of England